Stellaster is a genus of echinoderms belonging to the family Goniasteridae.

The species of this genus are found in Old World.

Species:

Stellaster albensis 
Stellaster childreni 
Stellaster convexus 
Stellaster inspinosus 
Stellaster princeps 
Stellaster squamulosus 
Stellaster tuberculosus

References

Goniasteridae
Asteroidea genera